The 2005 NCAA Women's Gymnastics championship involved 12 schools competing for the national championship of women's NCAA Division I gymnastics.  It was the twenty fourth NCAA gymnastics national championship and the defending NCAA Team Champion for 2004 was UCLA Bruins.  The Competition took place in Auburn, Alabama hosted by the Auburn University in Beard–Eaves–Memorial Coliseum. The 2005 Championship was won by Georgia Gym Dogs, their first since 1999 and sixth all-time.

Champions

Team Results

Session 1

Session 2

Super Six

References

External links
 NCAA Gymnastics Championship Official site

NCAA Women's Gymnastics championship
2005 in women's gymnastics